To Rise Again at a Decent Hour is a novel by the American writer Joshua Ferris. The novel was shortlisted for the 2014 Man Booker Prize and won the 2014 Dylan Thomas Prize. It centers on a New York City dentist who's obsessed with the Boston Red Sox and, variously, the religions of different girlfriends. The discovery that he's the victim of a strange sort of identity theft leads him into a darkly comic crisis of identity and meaning.

References

2014 American novels
Identity theft in popular culture
Boston Red Sox
Fictional dentists
Little, Brown and Company books
Novels set in New York City
Novels about antisemitism
Novels about the Internet